Burleigh is a village in Berkshire, England, within the civil parish of Winkfield.

Villages in Berkshire
Winkfield